La Palma Intercommunity Hospital (LPH) is a 141-bed acute care facility in La Palma, California, US. LPH is owned and operated by Prime Healthcare Services (PHS), a hospital management company located in Victorville. PHS was founded in 2001 by Prem Reddy, who acts as its present chairman of the board. PHS has operated La Palma Intercommunity Hospital since 2006.

History

La Palma Intercommunity Hospital was founded as a general acute care hospital in 1972 and has gone through several ownership changes since its founding.

One of the first changes came in 1988 when the hospital's non-profit owners, HealthWest Foundation of Chatsworth, merged their services with another non-profit Southern California healthcare provider, LHS Corp., to create UniHealth America.

UniHealth America continued to operate LPH until 1998 when UniHealth faced financial challenges and was acquired by Catholic Healthcare West (CHW).

LPH's operation under Catholic Healthcare West was short lived, when the Catholic system divested LPH and another nearby Orange County hospital, Martin Luther Hospital Anaheim, to MemorialCare Health Systems after less than a year under CHW control. At the time, the operators discussed plans to consolidate services of the two hospitals and potential converting LPH to non-acute healthcare services.

MemorialCare Health Systems plans for LPH never came to fruition as the Long Beach-based non-profit sold the facility in December 1999 to for-profit Vanguard Health Systems, ending LPH's status as a non-profit facility.

Prime Healthcare Services purchased La Palma Intercommunity Hospital on October 1, 2006, from Vanguard Health Systems, along with two other Orange County acute care facilities, West Anaheim Medical Center and Huntington Beach Hospital, in a $40 million transaction.

References

Services
24-hour basic emergency
Cardio-Neuro
Cardiovascular Lab
Imaging Services - Digital Filmless Radiology
Clinical Lab
Critical Care/Stepdown Unit
Surgical Services
Pharmacy
Outpatient Physical Therapy
Bio-Medical
Women's Care - Centers of Excellence

Awards and recognitions
Accreditation by JACHO

External links
 Official La Palma Intercommunity Hospital website
La Palma Intercommunity Hospital in the CA Healthcare Atlas — a project by OSHPD

Hospitals in Orange County, California
La Palma, California
Prime Healthcare Services
Hospital buildings completed in 1972